George Wendell Pace (born 1929, died November 7, 2020) was an American professor of religion at Brigham Young University (BYU) in Provo, Utah.  He was a popular writer and speaker on religion in the Church of Jesus Christ of Latter-day Saints (LDS Church) and part of a public criticism voiced by Apostle Bruce R. McConkie in 1982.

Biography
Pace was one of twelve children born to Agnes Judd and Presley D. Pace in Burley, Idaho.  He was raised in the town, where his father served as Sheriff for 16 years.  As a young man and a member of the LDS Church, Pace served a proselyting mission in western Canada.

In the late 1940s Pace studied at Utah State Agricultural College in Logan, where he also ran cross-country.  While later attending BYU, Pace met and married Diane Carman of Portland, Oregon, with whom he would have 12 children.

In the LDS Church, Pace would serve in various callings throughout his life, including as a Sunday School teacher in Provo, Utah, a high councilor, a branch president at the Missionary Training Center, a stake presidency councilor, and a stake president.

He passed away from complications related to COVID-19 on November 7th, 2020 at his residence in Provo, Utah.

Career 

Pace had decided to teach LDS religion after several spiritual experiences.  After graduating from BYU in Political Science, he returned to his hometown of Burley to teach LDS Seminary in 1956, living on the family farm.

In 1961 Pace was appointed as the first director of the Institute of Religion adjacent to Colorado State University in Fort Collins, Colorado, where he then completed his master's degree.  In 1964 Pace became director of the Institute in Palo Alto, California, adjacent to Stanford University.  Pace was accepted into the religion faculty at BYU in 1967 and completed his master's degree in 1968 and his doctorate in religious education in 1976.

As one of the most popular BYU professors, next to Stephen Covey, Pace regularly drew attendees larger than his actual class size.  In 1978, BYU students named him Professor of the Year and he was known for spending large amounts of time helping students.  Pace was also a popular speaker in BYU's Education Week and Know Your Religion programs, and had several motivational talks recorded and sold on cassette tapes.

Pace was one of the few BYU faculty to vigorously oppose the appointment of Leonard J. Arrington as the LDS Church's historian; Arrington was the first Church Historian with professional academic qualifications and to not also hold a high place in the ecclesiastical hierarchy. In September 1976, with Apostle Ezra Taft Benson's assistant William Nelson, Pace wrote an anonymous critique of The Story of the Latter-day Saints as insufficiently reverential, which Benson and Mark E. Petersen then used to attack Arrington specifically and the professional attitude of the history department generally in a meeting with the first presidency on Sept 21st. It was decided that the volume would not be advertised by the church-owned publisher, Deseret Book, and all future manuscripts of the department must be read by an apostle before publication. Howard W. Hunter was in charge of the History Department at the time, resented being circumvented, and privately told Arrington he felt that Benson and Petersen's suggestion of concealing historical fact and adopting a uniformly providentialist point-of-view would have been "unethical and immoral" in a court of law. On November 24, Arrington learned that president Spencer W. Kimball had read the entire book himself, found nothing objectionable, and quietly removed all restrictions on marketing or endorsing the book.

McConkie criticism 
In 1982, Bruce R. McConkie, an apostle in the LDS Church, presented a televised sermon at BYU that was interpreted by some as an attack on Pace's book, What It Means to Know Christ.  In his sermon, McConkie did not mention Pace or his book by name, though he excerpted a quote which he called "plain sectarian nonsense", and warned against developing a special spiritual relationship with Jesus Christ, apart from the Holy Ghost and God the Father.  McConkie felt this was a "gospel hobby" that could lead to "an unwholesome holier-than-thou attitude" or "despondence".  McConkie said he didn't intend to "downgrade" Jesus, but to teach true doctrine and warn his audience.  McConkie later claimed he wasn't singling out or specifically thinking of Pace, but was warning against a general trend of "extreme behavior" of born-again type experiences.

According to his son, Pace was personally devastated and saw this as a public condemnation and rebuke.  He removed his book from the market, was released from his church position as stake president, and had a dramatic drop in class enrollment.  Pace issued a formal apology in which he stated that his opinions may be misinterpreted, and he was glad that McConkie had clarified the issues.  Pace wanted "to stay in the mainstream of the Church" and remain loyal to its leadership.  In contrast, Pace's son cited the controversy as disillusioning him toward his religious leaders and motivating him to leave the LDS Church.

Some have speculated that McConkie was reprimanded for downplaying Christ's importance and was asked to reemphasize Jesus in his future teachings.

Afterward 

After the fallout from the McConkie incident, Pace still retained his BYU religious professorship and served in leadership positions in the church.  He served for a time as a professor at the BYU Jerusalem Center.  Remembered as an effective teacher, in 2000 BYU Magazine printed his nomination for professor of the century.  In the early 2000s Pace and his wife were overseeing BYU's China Teachers Program, which arranges for retired educators from BYU to teach at Chinese universities.

Pace also continued publishing and public speaking in the LDS community.  His work was published in an official LDS Church magazine and in the church-sanctioned Encyclopedia of Mormonism.  Though originally published by Council Press, Pace's criticized book What It Means to Know Christ was even republished in 1988 by the church's own publisher, Deseret Book, as a new edition retitled Our Search to Know the Lord.  The work remains in print under the name Knowing Christ, published by Cedar Fort, Inc.  As a public speaker, Pace has addressed addiction recovery programs and religious topics into the late 1990s.

Published works
In 1975, Pace compiled a book of faith-promoting experiences entitled The Faith of Young Mormons.

In 1981, Pace published What it Means to Know Christ, which sold very well.  After Bruce R. McConkie's public criticisms, Pace revised the book and published it as Our Search to Know the Lord in 1988, and Knowing Christ in 1996.  Pace was a contributor to the Encyclopedia of Mormonism in 1992.

The following is a list of Pace's works:

Audio recordings 
.
.
.
.

.
.
.
.
.
.

References

External links
 1975 BYU Devotional talk by Pace
 Church Magazine article

1929 births
20th-century Mormon missionaries
American leaders of the Church of Jesus Christ of Latter-day Saints
American Mormon missionaries in Canada
Brigham Young University alumni
Brigham Young University faculty
Church Educational System instructors
Colorado State University alumni
American Latter Day Saint writers
Living people
Mormonism-related controversies
People from Burley, Idaho
Writers from Provo, Utah
Utah State University alumni
Latter Day Saints from Colorado
Latter Day Saints from California
Latter Day Saints from Idaho
Latter Day Saints from Utah